The 1974 Greenlandic Men's Football Championship was the 4th edition of the Greenlandic Men's Football Championship. The final round was held in Sisimiut. It was won by Siumut Amerdlok Kunuk.

See also
Football in Greenland
Football Association of Greenland
Greenland national football team
Greenlandic Men's Football Championship

References

Greenlandic Men's Football Championship seasons
Green
Green
Foot